Richard McCaslin (June 20, 1964 – October 14, 2018) was a former Marine, cosplayer, Batman stuntman at Six Flags AstroWorld, and convicted felon.

Background
McCaslin developed a fascination with comic books and super heroes while growing up in Zanesville, Ohio. Following his discharge from the Marine Corps, McCaslin developed the real-life superhero identity The Lynx in 1985. He briefly patrolled Zanesville with a teenage sidekick named Iron Claw. McCaslin would develop more personas over the years. He went on to live in Austin, Texas, and Carson City and Las Vegas, Nevada.

McCaslin was described as "an avid fan" of country music singer Chely Wright. In 2001, he attended a charity event and placed the winning bid of $14,500 for a dinner with the performer, with proceeds benefiting Wright's Reading, Writing and Rhythm Foundation. Subsequent United States Secret Service files obtained through the Freedom of Information Act indicate that McCaslin stalked Wright using mail sent to her fan group, sending a VHS tape to her brother and showing up at a concert in an attempt to slip her a note.

The Phantom Patriot 

On January 19, 2002, McCaslin attempted a raid on the Bohemian Grove campground, just north of San Francisco, while dressed as his alter ego The Phantom Patriot. McCaslin later claimed to have been concerned about ritualistic child sacrifice taking place at Bohemian Grove, after seeing the documentary film Dark Secrets Inside Bohemian Grove, by radio show host Alex Jones. McCaslin planned to burn the massive owl statue at the Bohemian Grove, believing it to be emblematic of the Canaanite god Moloch, associated with child sacrifice. Before departing Austin on his "mission," McCaslin claimed to have stopped by the AC-TV public access studios and spoken directly with Jones about Bohemian Grove, but says he made no indication of his plans to the host.

Wearing a skull mask and a blue jumpsuit with "Phantom Patriot" written in red on his chest, McCaslin entered the campground, armed with "a pump-action rifle/shotgun hybrid, a .45 caliber handgun, a crossbow, a 2-foot-long sword, a knife and a fireworks mortar tube." Due to the time of year, the camp was deserted except for some staff.

Upon entering the grove, McCaslin discovered that the owl was made of concrete instead of redwood, as he had believed, and could not be destroyed without explosives, which he had not brought. McCaslin also failed to find any evidence of the sacrificial rituals he believed he would interrupt.  He also became lost on the grounds after the batteries in his flashlight died and he had forgotten to bring spares. Frustrated, McCaslin kicked in the door to a cabin and slept in it overnight.

The following morning, McCaslin set a fire in the empty banquet hall, which triggered an alarm. McCaslin encountered caretaker Fred Yeager and maintenance worker Bob Hipkiss, but no guests were present.  Upon leaving the grounds. McCaslin pointed his MK-1 rifle at Yeager as he sat in his security booth, believing the phone Yeager held to be a gun. McCaslin encountered law enforcement officers that had surrounded his truck, and was later removed following a tense armed standoff. McCaslin later claimed in correspondence with author Tea Krulos that his thoughts about the slim possibility of seeing Chely Wright again kept him from turning violent. McCaslin was briefly held at the mental health ward of the Sonoma County Jail.

He was later convicted on felony charges of arson, burglary, brandishing a weapon at a peace officer, and two counts for being armed and wearing a bulletproof vest. He was imprisoned in California.

After prison release
McCaslin was paroled on May 19, 2008.

After Alex Jones publicly disavowed responsibility for McCaslin's actions, McCaslin became a devotee of British conspiracy theorist David Icke, whose theories included the "Reptoid" hypothesis, that several prominent politicians are in fact extraterrestrial beings (or the offspring of such beings with humans) in disguise.

On June 28, 2011, using the name "Thoughtcrime", McCaslin protested outside the Alcoa plant in Davenport, Iowa, where Barack Obama was speaking. He accused Obama, as well as the Bushes, the Clintons and others of being "blue bloods" (reptoid/human hybrids).

Death
A report filed by the Washington, D.C. Metropolitan Police Department on October 15, 2018, indicates McCaslin attempted suicide. Police found McCaslin suffering from a head injury in his truck, parked in an alley next to the House of the Temple, a Masonic Temple. The Freemasons were a frequent subject of McCaslin's conspiracy theories. He was pronounced dead the following day.

Media portrayals 
McCaslin was profiled in journalist Tea Krulos's 2013 book Heroes in the Night; Inside the Real Life Superhero Movement. and more extensively in Krulos's 2020 book American Madness: The Story of the Phantom Patriot and How Conspiracy Theorists Hijacked American Consciousness.
McCaslin is the subject of the song "Phantom Patriot" by Les Claypool on his album Of Whales and Woe.
McCaslin also uploaded six videos to YouTube.

References

American people convicted of arson
American conspiracy theorists
1964 births
2018 deaths
American people convicted of burglary
United States Marines
2018 suicides
Suicides in Washington, D.C.